"Angel" is a song by American singer-songwriter Amanda Perez. Written by Perez and produced by Mike Quinn, "Angel" was released as a single in August 2002 and was included on Perez's second studio album of the same name, released later the same year. In the United States, the single reached the top five of the Billboard Mainstream Top 40 and the top 20 of the Billboard Hot 100. The song was also a top-five hit in Australia and New Zealand, peaking at number one in the latter country for two weeks.

Release
The song was released to US rhythmic contemporary radio on August 26, 2002. The D-Lo Urban Remix was released to US radio as a Single Mix for Promo. It was also released digitally.

Reception

Critical
The review by AllMusic praised her vocal performance and named it the best song on its parent album.

Commercial
In the United States, it reached number 20 on the Billboard Hot 100, spending 19 weeks on the chart. On the Rhythmic chart, the song reached number 13. The song was most successful in the US on the Mainstream Top 40, where it reached number three and spent 25 total weeks. The track also hit number seven on MTV's Total Request Live. Billboard ranked the song as the 69th most-successful of 2003 in the US.

The song was also successful in Canada, where it peaked at number 12 in June 2003. On the New Zealand Singles Chart, the single reached number one, spending for two weeks atop the chart in June 2003. The following month, "Angel" reached number two on the Australian ARIA Singles Chart. "Angel" was ranked at number 13 on ARIA's list of top 100 songs of 2003 and number 15 on the New Zealand year-end chart for 2003.

Perez's subsequent singles failed to break the top 40 in any country, essentially making Perez a one-hit wonder (though she also scored a minor hit with "Never," which peaked at number 79 on the Billboard Hot 100). Additionally, it was the last song to be played as a long-distance dedication on American Top 40 in January 2004, as Ryan Seacrest replaced Casey Kasem a week later, though long-distance dedications continued on American Top 20 and American Top 10 until both shows ended in 2009.

Music video
A music video was released, featuring Perez having flashbacks of her boyfriend (implied to be dead), and footage of her lighting candles. The music video was dedicated to two of her family members who had passed, Michael and Benitez Perez. The music video received substantial play on MTV's "Total Request Live."

Track listings

Charts

Weekly charts

Year-end charts

Certifications

Release history

References

External links
 View the music video on YouTube

2002 singles
2002 songs
Amanda Perez songs
Number-one singles in New Zealand
Songs about heartache
Virgin Records singles